Richard Swanson (born 1945) is an American electrical engineer and businessman, retired founder of SunPower, a solar photovoltaic cell manufacturer.

Biography 
Swanson was born in Davenport, Iowa in 1945.

He graduated in 1969 with Bachelor of Engineering and Master of Engineering degrees from Ohio State University and, in 1975, received a Doctor of Philosophy in electrical engineering from Stanford University. He then joined the university faculty at Stanford and began research in solar cell technology. In 1985 Swanson received grants for his solar energy research from the Electric Power Research Institute and the U.S. Department of Energy. That same year he founded SunPower Corporation. Swanson is credited for creating Swanson's law, an observation that solar cell prices decline by 20% for every doubling of solar panel industry capacity. The law is often compared to the better known Moore's Law. While Swanson is more frequently associated with Gordon Moore because of the similarity of their eponymous "laws", the current CEO, and former colleague of Swanson's, Tom Werner has called him the "Shockley of solar", a reference to William Shockley.

Honors 
In 2002, Richard was awarded the William R. Cherry award by the Institute of Electrical and Electronics Engineers (IEEE). Additionally, Swanson received the Becquerel Prize in Photovoltaics from the European Communities in 2006. He was elected a Fellow of the IEEE in 2008 and has been a member of the National Academy of Engineering since 2009.

References

External links 
 Richard Swanson at Stanford University

1945 births
Living people
American electrical engineers
Ohio State University alumni
Stanford University alumni
Scientists from Davenport, Iowa